Maxim Alexeyevich Shuvalov (23 April 1993 – 7 September 2011) was a Russian professional ice hockey player who at the time of his death would have played for Lokomotiv Yaroslavl of the Kontinental Hockey League.

Biography
Maxim Shuvalov was a player for Russian junior national ice-hockey team. He won a bronze medal at 2011 IIHF World U18 Championships. At the club level, he played for the youth team of Lokomotiv Yaroslavl, Loko. He was transferred to the main team just before the start of the new KHL season.

On 7 September 2011, Shuvalov was killed in the 2011 Lokomotiv Yaroslavl plane crash, when a Yakovlev Yak-42 passenger aircraft, carrying nearly his entire Lokomotiv team, crashed just outside Yaroslavl, Russia. The team was traveling to Minsk to play their opening game of the season, with its coaching staff and prospects. Lokomotiv officials said "'everyone from the main roster was on the plane plus four players from the youth team.'" Aged only 18, he was the youngest member to die in the plane crash.

See also
List of ice hockey players who died during their playing career

References

External links

1993 births
2011 deaths
People from Rybinsk
Russian ice hockey defencemen
Victims of the Lokomotiv Yaroslavl plane crash
Sportspeople from Yaroslavl Oblast